Malik Ahmad Saeed Khan is a Pakistani politician who was a Member of the Provincial Assembly of the Punjab, from 2002 to 2007 and again from May 2013 to May 2018 and from August 2018 to January 2023.

Early life and education
He was born on 23 March 1975 in Kasur.

He has the degree of Bachelor of Laws which he obtained in 2000 from University of the Punjab.

Political career

He was elected to the Provincial Assembly of the Punjab as a candidate of Pakistan Muslim League (Q) (PML-Q) from Constituency PP-178 (Kasur-IV) in 2002 Pakistani general election. He received 21,261 votes and defeated Chaudhry Ahmed Ali Tolo, a candidate of Pakistan Peoples Party (PPP).

He ran for the seat of the Provincial Assembly of the Punjab as a candidate of PML-Q from Constituency PP-178 (Kasur-IV) in 2008 Pakistani general election, but was unsuccessful. He received 19,416 votes and lost the seat to Ahmad Ali Tolu, a candidate of PPP.

He was re-elected to the Provincial Assembly of the Punjab as a candidate of Pakistan Muslim League (N) (PML-N) from Constituency PP-178 (Kasur-IV) in 2013 Pakistani general election. He received 34,335 votes and defeated an independent candidate,  Shahid Masood Ali.

He was re-elected to Provincial Assembly of the Punjab as a candidate of PML-N from Constituency PP-175 (Kasur-II) in 2018 Pakistani general election.

Kasur pedophilia scandal
In 2015, Saeed was accused of attempting to protect the culprits of Kasur pedophilia ring.

References

Living people
Punjab MPAs 2013–2018
1975 births
Pakistan Muslim League (N) MPAs (Punjab)
Punjab MPAs 2002–2007
Punjab MPAs 2018–2023